Bruna Rossi (born 15 July 1948) is a retired Italian diver. She competed at the 1968 Summer Olympics in the 10 m platform and finished in 21st place.

References

1948 births
Living people
Olympic divers of Italy
Divers at the 1968 Summer Olympics
Italian female divers